Lattes may refer to:
 Lattes, Hérault, a commune in southern France
Canton of Lattes
 the plural of "latte":
 Latte, a type of coffee drink
 Latte stone, traditionally used in the Marianas
 Lattes Platform, the Brazilian Government information system on science and technology

People with the name 
 César Lattes (1924–2005), Brazilian physicist
 Franco Lattes (1917–1994), Italian writer
 Isaac Lattes (14th-century), a rabbi who lived in Provence
 Marcel Lattès (1886–1943), French composer
 Samuel Lattès (1873–1918), French mathematician

See also
 JC Lattès, a French publishing house
 Lattès map, in mathematics
 Latte (disambiguation)

Sephardic surnames